The Konica C35 AF was the first mass-produced autofocus camera. it was first released in November 1977.

Features
This was an autofocus version of the Konica C35 Automatic camera. It featured a fixed-aperture Hexanon 38 mm f/2.8 autofocus lens with a leaf shutter, a built-in electronic flash, and an automatic exposure system to select the appropriate shutter speed. The film advance was mechanical.

The shutter was electronically controlled with three speeds, 1/60, 1/125, and 1/250. The exposure system could handle  film speeds from ISO 25 to ISO 400 and the built in flash had a guide number of 14 at ISO 100 covering distances from 1.1m to 5m.

This camera was the first mass-produced camera with built in autofocus and used a system with an electronic version of a  split-image rangefinder.

References
 Konica C35 Automatic by Luis Triguez
 Konica C35 AF from Camerapedia at Fandom
 Konica C35 AF User's Manual

135 film cameras
Autofocus cameras
Point-and-shoot cameras
C35 AF
Cameras introduced in 1977
Products introduced in 1977